Technical and further education or simply TAFE, is the common name in English-speaking countries in Oceania for vocational education, as a subset of tertiary education. TAFE institutions provide a wide range of predominantly vocational courses.  

Individual TAFE institutions (usually with numerous campuses) are known as either colleges or institutes, depending on the country, state or territory. 

In Australia, where the term TAFE originated, institutions usually host qualifying courses, under the National Training System/Australian Qualifications Framework/Australian Quality Training Framework. Fields covered include business, finance, hospitality, tourism, construction, engineering, visual arts, information technology and community work. TAFE colleges are owned, operated and financed by the various state/territory governments.

Qualifications awarded by TAFE colleges
TAFE colleges award Australian Qualifications Framework (AQF) qualifications accredited in the Vocational Education and Training (VET) sector that align to Certificate I, Certificate II, Certificate III, Certificate IV, Diploma, Advanced Diploma, Graduate Certificate and Graduate Diploma qualifications. In many instances, TAFE study at a Diploma or above level can be used as partial credit towards bachelor's degree-level university programs.

From 2002 the TAFE education sector has been able to offer bachelor's degrees and post-graduate diploma courses to fill niche areas, particularly vocationally focused areas of study based on industry needs. As at June 2009 10 TAFE colleges (mainly in New South Wales, Victoria, but also Western Australia, ACT, and Queensland) now confer their own degree-level awards and post graduate diplomas, though initially not beyond the level of bachelor's degree. However Melbourne Polytechnic has been accredited in 2015 to offer two master's degree courses. Similarly, some universities (e.g., Charles Darwin University and Royal Melbourne Institute of Technology) offer vocational education courses (traditionally the domain of TAFE); these are funded by the local state and territory governments. Some high schools also deliver courses developed and accredited by TAFEs.
 
Students who enrol in these undergraduate degree courses at TAFE are required to pay full fees and are not entitled to Commonwealth Government supported student fee loans, known as HECS loans, but may access a FEE-HELP loan scheme. While Universities have the ability and power to design and offer their own degree courses, each TAFE degree course must be assessed and approved by the Higher Education Accreditation Committee (HEAC).

TAFEs in some states can also teach senior high school qualifications, like the Victorian Certificate of Education, Victorian Certificate of Applied Learning, and the Higher School Certificate. Some universities, e.g. Charles Darwin University and Royal Melbourne Institute of Technology, offer TAFE courses; these are funded by the local state and territory governments. Some high schools also deliver courses developed and accredited by TAFEs.

Some private institutions also offer courses from TAFEs, however they more commonly offer other vocational education and training courses. Many Australians refer to all sub-degree courses as "TAFE" courses, no matter what institution creates or delivers the course. Before the 1990s, the TAFEs had a near monopoly in the sector. TAFE courses provide students an opportunity for certificate, diploma, and advanced diploma qualifications in a wide range of areas.

TAFE colleges by state/territory

In most cases, TAFE campuses are grouped into TAFE institutions or institutes along geographic lines. Most TAFEs are given a locally recognised region of the country where they exclusively operate covering a wide range of subjects.

A few TAFEs specialise in a single area of study. These are usually found near the middle of the capital cities, and they service the whole state or territory. For example, the Trade and Technician Skills Institute in Brisbane, from 1 July 2006, has specialised in automotive, building and construction, manufacturing and engineering, and electrical/electronic studies for students throughout Queensland and the William Angliss Institute of TAFE in Melbourne has specialised in food, hospitality and tourism courses for Victoria.

Australian Capital Territory
In the Australian Capital Territory, these include:
 Canberra Institute of Technology

New South Wales
There are ten TAFE NSW Institutes in NSW, namely:
Hunter Institute
Illawarra Institute
New England Institute
North Coast Institute
Northern Sydney Institute
Riverina Institute
South Western Sydney Institute
Sydney Institute
Western Institute
Western Sydney Institute, including OTEN

Northern Territory
In the Northern Territory, these include:
 Charles Darwin University
 Batchelor Institute of Indigenous Tertiary Education

Queensland
In Queensland, TAFE Queensland includes:

As of May 2014, the TAFE institutes have amalgamated into six regions of the central TAFE Queensland (parent body). The regions of TAFE Queensland are:
 Brisbane (formerly Brisbane North Institute of TAFE, Metropolitan South Institute of TAFE and Southbank Institute of Technology)
 Gold Coast (formerly Gold Coast Institute of TAFE)
 East Coast (formerly Sunshine Coast Institute of TAFE and Wide Bay Institute of TAFE)
 South West (formerly Bremer Institute of TAFE and Southern Queensland Institute of TAFE)
 North (formerly Barrier Reef Institute of TAFE, Mount Isa Institute of TAFE and Tropical North Queensland TAFE)
 SkillsTech (formerly SkillsTech Australia)

And as of the 1st of July 2014, Central Queensland TAFE (branded as CQ TAFE) was merged into Central Queensland University (branded as CQUniversity) to create Queensland's first dual sector university.

South Australia
In South Australia:

 TAFE SA

Tasmania
In Tasmania, there are two government TAFE organisations:

TAFE Tasmania includes:
 Institute of TAFE Tasmania (general)
 Drysdale Institute (for tourism and hospitality)
Australian Maritime College TAFE (maritime studies)

Victoria

In Victoria these include:
 Bendigo Regional Institute of TAFE (Local: Bendigo-Echuca)
 Box Hill Institute of TAFE (Local: Eastern Melbourne, Specialist: Short courses)
 Chisholm Institute (Local: South East Melbourne)
 East Gippsland Institute of TAFE (Local: East Gippsland)
 Central Gippsland Institute of TAFE (Local: West and South Gippsland, Specialist: High-voltage electrical)
 Federation TAFE (Local: Ballarat and Horsham - Central Highlands/Wimmera, Specialist: Agriculture & Horticulture, Building & Construction, Business & IT, Community Services, Food & Hospitality, Hair & Beauty, Manufacturing Engineering)
 Gordon Institute of TAFE (Local: Geelong)
 Goulburn Ovens Institute of TAFE (Local: North East Victoria)
 Holmesglen Institute of TAFE (Local: Eastern Melbourne)
 Kangan Institute (Local: North West Melbourne, Specialist: Automotive, Fashion)
 Melbourne Polytechnic (Local: Northern and inner East Melbourne, Specialist: Equine, Aquaculture, Agriculture, Viticulture, Music)
 RMIT University (Specialist: Various)
 South West Institute of TAFE (Local: Western District)
 Sunraysia Institute of TAFE (Local: North West Victoria)
 Swinburne University of Technology (Local: Eastern Melbourne)
 University of Ballarat (Local: Ballarat-Wimmera)
 Victoria University (Local: Western Melbourne)
 William Angliss Institute of TAFE (Specialist: Hospitality)
 Wodonga Institute of TAFE (Local: Wodonga, Specialist: Driving)
 The University of Melbourne discontinued its TAFE arm (which specialised in agriculture and forestry) at the start of 2007.

Western Australia

In Western Australia, this includes:

North Metropolitan TAFE (Formerly Central Institute of Technology & West Coast Institute of Training)
South Metropolitan TAFE (Formerly Challenger Institute of Technology & Polytechnic West)
Central Regional TAFE (Formerly Durack Institute of Technology, Goldfields Institute of Technology & C. Y. O'Connor Institute) 
South Regional TAFE (Formerly South West Institute of Technology & Great Southern Institute of Technology)
North Regional TAFE (Formerly Kimberley TAFE & Pilbara Institute)

See also
Education in Australia
Further education
Registered Training Organisations
TAFE Outreach
Vocational education

References

External links

State and territory TAFE websites
TAFE NSW
TAFE Victoria
Victorian TAFE Courses 
TAFE QLD
Trade and Technician Skills Institute
TAFE SA
TAFE WA
West Coast Institute of Training
TAFE Tasmania
Canberra Institute of Technology
International colleges in Australasia

Victorian Association of TAFE Libraries
VATL

Vocational education and training (VET)
Department of Education, Science and Training (DEST)
National Centre for Vocational Education Research (NCVER)
Australian Flexible Learning Framework (FLX)
National Association of TAFE Managers – (AUSTAFE Inc.)
National Register of VET (TGA formerly known as the NTIS – national database of VET providers and qualifications)

Career guidance
 Australian Government myfuture portal: career guide Registration required
 Training Advisor- Career & TAFE Course Advice  Free to Individuals & Businesses

TAFE union sites
AEU Victoria – TAFE Teachers
Our TAFEs Matter – NTEU
TAFE course comparison sites

 Training.com.au - Directory of TAFE courses
 Tafecourses.com.au - TAFE courses & information from across Australia

Australian vocational education and training providers
Vocational education